Love Man is the third posthumous album by American soul recording artist Otis Redding. It was released in June 1969 and featured songs Redding had recorded in 1967. The album was produced by Steve Cropper, and featured Booker T. and the M.G.'s.

The album was a part of a series of posthumous releases by Atco Records after Redding's mainstream reputation skyrocketed in the wake of his 1967 death. Love Man charted at number 46 on the Billboard 200 and number 8 on the R&B Albums.

Songs 
"Direct Me" has pop and gospel elements and a heavy tambourine-laden arrangement. On "I'm a Changed Man", Redding employed scat singing. The album's title track has a mid-tempo funk groove and lyrical references to the hippie culture that had begun to appreciate Redding at the time. The song charted at number 72 on the Billboard Hot 100 and number 17 on the R&B Singles. "A Lover's Question" peaked at number 48 and number 20, respectively, and "Free Me" reached number 30 on the R&B Singles chart.

Critical reception 

In a contemporary review, Robert Christgau of The Village Voice said that, although its "tender passages" are not on-par with Redding's best work, Love Man is his "best LP since Immortal." Ed Leimbacher of Rolling Stone magazine wrote that the album has "several of his very strongest performances on record" and praised the "loose imagination and tight style" of the M.G.'s backing group. Leimbacher hailed Redding as a "musical genius" and called "Direct Me" "one of the best Memphis soul cuts of all time".

In a review upon its 1992 reissue, Ira Robbins of Entertainment Weekly said that Love Man has "substantial songs soaked in instrumental spirit and topped off with Redding's emotion-packed vocals." Q magazine wrote that it "showcases Redding at his up-tempo frantic and frenetic best". By contrast, Allmusic's Mark Deming felt that the album is "flawed" because of material that is weaker than his previous albums, even though it has "Redding's indefatigable energy and conviction as a vocalist and the ever-indomitable groove of Steve Cropper, Al Jackson, Jr., and the other members of the Stax Records studio crew." Matthew Greenwald of Allmusic said that, apart from "(Sittin' On) The Dock of the Bay", the album's title track was "one of Otis Redding's finest and most commercial sides that he cut at the end of his brief career."

Track listing

Personnel
Credits adapted from Allmusic.
 Otis Redding - vocals
 Booker T. Jones, Isaac Hayes - keyboards, organ, piano
 Steve Cropper - guitar, producer
 Donald Dunn - bass guitar
 Al Jackson Jr. - drums
 Wayne Jackson - trumpet
 Andrew Love, Joe Arnold - tenor saxophone

 Reissue
 Ron Capone and Jim Stewart - engineer
 Paul C. Acree Jr. - cover photo
 Loring Eutemey - design
 Yves Beauvais - producer
 Steve Cropper - producer, remixing
 Tom Dowd - remixing
 Dan Hersch - remixing
 Bill Inglot - remixing

Charts

Album

Singles

See also 
 The Dock of the Bay (album)

References

External links
 

1969 albums
Otis Redding albums
Albums produced by Steve Cropper
Albums published posthumously
Atco Records albums